The women's 10 metre platform was part of the Diving at the 2014 Commonwealth Games program. The competition was held on 31 July 2014 at Royal Commonwealth Pool in Edinburgh.

Schedule
All times are British Summer Time (UTC+1)

Format
The 12 divers will dive compete in a preliminary round, with each driver making five dives.  All 12 divers will advance to the final round during the evening session, where all previous scores will be cleared.

Results
Green denotes finalists

References

Diving at the 2014 Commonwealth Games
Com